A Tear for the Ghetto is the second album by the hip hop duo Group Home. It was released in 1999 on Replay Records. The album contained one hit single, "Make It In Life," which made to No. 16 on the Hot Rap Singles. It was produced by The Alchemist, Agallah, Guru, DJ Premier, and group member Lil' Dap.

Critical reception
Exclaim! wrote that the "production from Agallah and the Alchemist among others [provides] a low-slung minimalism that connects favourably with Lil’ Dap’s improved flow and lyrics concerning his low budget environment."

Track listing
"Tear Shit Down"- 3:31
"Da Real GH"- 4:06
"Stupid Mf's"- 4:37
"Street Life"- 1:57
"Sun for a Reason"- 4:04
"The Legacy"- 4:01 (Featuring Gang Starr)
"Run for Your Life"- 4:21 (Featuring Agallah)
"Make It in Life"- 4:42
"A Train X-Press"- 3:50
"Be Like That"- 4:40 (Featuring Blackadon, Guru)
"Dial-A-Thug"- 3:51 (Featuring Mike Epps, Dominique Witten)
"Politic All Night"- 1:22
"Keep Rising"- 4:23
"We Can Do This"- 3:37
"12 O'Clock"- 4:09
"Oh Sweet America"- 3:59
"Breaker"- 3:12
"Beefin' for Rap"- 2:38
"Game Recognize Game"- 1:42
"Life Ain't Shit"- 4:36

References

1999 albums
Group Home albums
Albums produced by DJ Premier
Albums produced by the Alchemist (musician)
Albums produced by Agallah